Bema is a genus of snout moths. It was described by Harrison Gray Dyar Jr. in 1914 and is known from Panama and St. Thomas.

Species
 Bema myja Dyar, 1914
 Bema neuricella (Zeller, 1848)
 Bema ydda (Dyar, 1914)

References

Phycitinae